Camille Laurin (May 6, 1922 – March 11, 1999) was a psychiatrist and Parti Québécois (PQ) politician in the Canadian province of Quebec. A MNA member for the riding of Bourget, he is considered the father of Quebec's language law known informally as "Bill 101".

Biography
Born in Charlemagne, Quebec, Laurin obtained a degree in psychiatry from the Université de Montréal where he came under the influence of the Roman Catholic priest, Lionel Groulx. After earning his degree, Laurin went to Boston, Massachusetts, in the United States, where he worked at the Boston State Hospital. Following a stint in Paris in 1957, he returned to practice in Quebec. In 1961, he authored the preface of the book Les fous crient au secours, which described the conditions of psychiatric hospitals of the time.

He was one of the early founders of the Quebec sovereignty movement. As a senior cabinet minister in the first PQ government elected in the 1976 Quebec election, he was the guiding force behind Bill 101, the legislation that placed restrictions on the use of English on public signs and in the workplace of large companies, and strengthened the position of French as the only official language in Quebec.

Laurin resigned from his cabinet position on November 26, 1984 because of a disagreement with Lévesque on the future of the sovereignty movement. He resigned from his seat in the National Assembly on January 25, 1985. He was elected once again to the Assembly on September 12, 1994 but did not run in the 1998 election for health reasons.

He died in 1999 after a long battle with cancer.

Bibliography
 Les fous crient au secours (1961)

See also
 Parti Québécois Crisis, 1984
 Quebec nationalism
 List of third party leaders (Quebec)
 History of Quebec

External links

Biography on Vigile.net

1922 births
1999 deaths
Canadian psychiatrists
Parti Québécois MNAs
Université de Montréal alumni
Canadian Roman Catholics
Deputy premiers of Quebec
People from Charlemagne, Quebec
Politicians from Montreal
Canadian expatriates in the United States
Canadian expatriates in France
Boston State Hospital physicians
20th-century Canadian physicians